In 1989, the BMP expanded to include 87 wards. Here is the list of wards.

See also
 1989 Bangalore Municipal Corporation election
 List of wards in Bangalore (1995-2006)
 List of wards in Bangalore

References

External links
 Bruhat Bengaluru Mahanagara Palike ward information
 Bruhat Bengaluru Mahanagara Palike wards list
 Bruhat Bengaluru Mahanagara Palike Wards Mapview OpenCity

Bangalore-related lists
Municipal wards of Bangalore